The Asia/Oceania Zone was one of the three zones of the regional Davis Cup competition in 2001.

In the Asia/Oceania Zone there were four different tiers, called groups, in which teams competed against each other to advance to the upper tier. The top two teams in Group III advanced to the Asia/Oceania Zone Group II in 2002, whereas the bottom two teams were relegated to the Asia/Oceania Zone Group IV in 2002.

Participating nations

Draw
 Venue: Rizal Memorial Sports Complex, Manila, Philippines
 Date: 7–11 February

Group A

Group B

1st to 4th place play-offs

5th to 8th place play-offs

Final standings

  and  promoted to Group II in 2002.
  and  relegated to Group IV in 2002.

Round robin

Group A

Philippines vs. Singapore

Bahrain vs. Sri Lanka

Philippines vs. Bahrain

Sri Lanka vs. Singapore

Philippines vs. Sri Lanka

Bahrain vs. Singapore

Group B

Kazakhstan vs. Qatar

Saudi Arabia vs. Tajikistan

Kazakhstan vs. Saudi Arabia

Tajikistan vs. Qatar

Kazakhstan vs. Tajikistan

Saudi Arabia vs. Qatar

1st to 4th place play-offs

Semifinals

Philippines vs. Tajikistan

Kazakhstan vs. Singapore

Final

Philippines vs. Kazakhstan

3rd to 4th play-off

Tajikistan vs. Singapore

5th to 8th place play-offs

5th to 8th play-offs

Sri Lanka vs. Qatar

Saudi Arabia vs. Bahrain

5th to 6th play-off

Qatar vs. Saudi Arabia

7th to 8th play-off

Sri Lanka vs. Bahrain

References

External links
Davis Cup official website

Davis Cup Asia/Oceania Zone
Asia Oceania Zone Group III